Nickel titanium, also known as Nitinol, is a metal alloy of nickel and titanium, where the two elements are present in roughly equal atomic percentages. Different alloys are named according to the weight percentage of nickel; e.g., Nitinol 55 and Nitinol 60. It exhibits the shape memory effect and superelasticity at different temperatures.

Nitinol alloys exhibit two closely related and unique properties: the shape memory effect and superelasticity (also called pseudoelasticity). Shape memory is the ability of Nitinol to undergo deformation at one temperature, stay in its deformed shape when the external force is removed, then recover its original, undeformed shape upon heating above its "transformation temperature". Superelasticity is the ability for the metal to undergo large deformations and immediately return to its undeformed shape upon removal of the external load. Nitinol can deform 10–30 times as much as ordinary metals and return to its original shape. Whether Nitinol behaves with the shape memory effect or superelasticity depends on whether it is above the transformation temperature of the specific alloy. Below the transformation temperature it exhibits the shape memory effect, and above that temperature it behaves superelastically.

History
The word Nitinol is derived from its composition and its place of discovery: (Nickel Titanium-Naval Ordnance Laboratory). William J. Buehler along with Frederick Wang, discovered its properties during research at the Naval Ordnance Laboratory in 1959. Buehler was attempting to make a better missile nose cone, which could resist fatigue, heat and the force of impact. Having found that a 1:1 alloy of nickel and titanium could do the job, in 1961 he presented a sample at a laboratory management meeting. The sample, folded up like an accordion, was passed around and flexed by the participants. One of them applied heat from his pipe lighter to the sample and, to everyone's surprise, the accordion-shaped strip contracted and took its previous shape.

While the potential applications for nitinol were realized immediately, practical efforts to commercialize the alloy did not take place until a decade later. This delay was largely because of the extraordinary difficulty of melting, processing and machining the alloy. Even these efforts encountered financial challenges that were not readily overcome until the 1980s, when these practical difficulties finally began to be resolved.

The discovery of the shape-memory effect in general dates back to 1932, when Swedish chemist Arne Ölander first observed the property in gold–cadmium alloys. The same effect was observed in Cu-Zn (brass) in the early 1950s.

Mechanism

Nitinol's unusual properties are derived from a reversible solid-state phase transformation known as a martensitic transformation, between two different martensite crystal phases, requiring  of mechanical stress.

At high temperatures, nitinol assumes an interpenetrating simple cubic structure referred to as austenite (also known as the parent phase).  At low temperatures, nitinol spontaneously transforms to a more complicated monoclinic crystal structure known as martensite (daughter phase).  There are four transition temperatures associated to the austenite-to-martensite and martensite-to-austenite transformations. Starting from full austenite, martensite begins to form as the alloy is cooled to the so-called martensite start temperature, or Ms, and the temperature at which the transformation is complete is called the martensite finish temperature, or Mf. When the alloy is fully martensite and is subjected to heating, austenite starts to form at the austenite start temperature, As, and finishes at the austenite finish temperature, Af.
The cooling/heating cycle shows thermal hysteresis. The hysteresis width depends on the precise nitinol composition and processing. Its typical value is a temperature range spanning about 20–50 K (20–50 °C; 36–90 °F) but it can be reduced or amplified by alloying and processing.

Crucial to nitinol properties are two key aspects of this phase transformation.  First is that the transformation is "reversible", meaning that heating above the transformation temperature will revert the crystal structure to the simpler austenite phase. The second key point is that the transformation in both directions is instantaneous.

Martensite's crystal structure (known as a monoclinic, or B19' structure) has the unique ability to undergo limited deformation in some ways without breaking atomic bonds. This type of deformation is known as twinning, which consists of the rearrangement of atomic planes without causing slip, or permanent deformation. It is able to undergo about 6–8% strain in this manner.  When martensite is reverted to austenite by heating, the original austenitic structure is restored, regardless of whether the martensite phase was deformed.  Thus the name "shape memory" refers to the fact that the shape of the high temperature austenite phase is "remembered," even though the alloy is severely deformed at a lower temperature. 

One of the reasons that nitinol works so hard to return to its original shape is that it is not just an ordinary metal alloy, but what is known as an intermetallic compound. In an ordinary alloy, the constituents are randomly positioned in the crystal lattice; in an ordered intermetallic compound, the atoms (in this case, nickel and titanium) have very specific locations in the lattice. The fact that nitinol is an intermetallic is largely responsible for the complexity in fabricating devices made from the alloy.

The scenario described above (cooling austenite to form martensite, deforming the martensite, then heating to revert to austenite, thus returning the original, undeformed shape) is known as the thermal shape memory effect. This process is usually called shape setting. A second effect, called superelasticity or pseudoelasticity, is also observed in nitinol. This effect is the direct result of the fact that martensite can be formed by applying a stress as well as by cooling. Thus in a certain temperature range, one can apply a stress to austenite, causing martensite to form while at the same time changing shape. In this case, as soon as the stress is removed, the nitinol will spontaneously return to its original shape. In this mode of use, nitinol behaves like a super spring, possessing an elastic range 10–30 times greater than that of a normal spring material. There are, however, constraints: the effect is only observed about 273–313 K (0–40 °C; 32–104 °F) above the Af temperature. This upper limit is referred to as Md, which corresponds to the highest temperature in which it is still possible to stress-induce the formation of martensite. Below Md, martensite formation under load allows superelasticity due to twinning. Above Md, since martensite is no longer formed, the only response to stress is slip of the austenitic microstructure, and thus permanent deformation.

Nitinol is typically composed of approximately 50 to 51% nickel by atomic percent (55 to 56% weight percent). Making small changes in the composition can change the transition temperature of the alloy significantly. Transformation temperatures in nitinol can be controlled to some extent, where Af temperature ranges from about −20 °C to +110 °C. Thus, it is common practice to refer to a nitinol formulation as "superelastic" or "austenitic" if Af is lower than a reference temperature, while as "shape memory" or "martensitic" if higher. The reference temperature is usually defined as the room temperature or the human body temperature (37 °C; 98 °F).

One often-encountered effect regarding nitinol is the so-called R-phase.  The R-phase is another martensitic phase that competes with the martensite phase mentioned above. Because it does not offer the large memory effects of the martensite phase, it is usually of non practical use.

Manufacturing process
Nitinol is exceedingly difficult to make, due to the exceptionally tight compositional control required, and the tremendous reactivity of titanium.  Every atom of titanium that combines with oxygen or carbon is an atom that is robbed from the NiTi lattice, thus shifting the composition and making the transformation temperature that much lower. There are two primary melting methods used today:

 Vacuum arc remelting (VAR)  This is done by striking an electrical arc between the raw material and a water-cooled copper strike plate.  Melting is done in a high vacuum, and the mold itself is water-cooled copper.
 Vacuum induction melting (VIM)  This is done by using alternating magnetic fields to heat the raw materials in a crucible (generally carbon). This is also done in a high vacuum.

While both methods have advantages, it has been demonstrated that an industrial state-of-the-art VIM melted material has smaller inclusions than an industrial state-of-the-art VAR one, leading to a higher fatigue resistance. Other research report that VAR employing extreme high-purity raw materials may lead to a reduced number of inclusions and thus to an improved fatigue behavior. Other methods are also used on a boutique scale, including plasma arc melting, induction skull melting, and e-beam melting. Physical vapour deposition is also used on a laboratory scale.

Heat treating nitinol is delicate and critical. It is a knowledge intensive process to fine-tune the transformation temperatures. Aging time and temperature controls the precipitation of various Ni-rich phases, and thus controls how much nickel resides in the NiTi lattice; by depleting the matrix of nickel, aging increases the transformation temperature. The combination of heat treatment and cold working is essential in controlling the properties of nitinol products.

Challenges 
Fatigue failures of nitinol devices are a constant subject of discussion.  Because it is the material of choice for applications requiring enormous flexibility and motion (e.g., peripheral stents, heart valves, smart thermomechanical actuators and electromechanical microactuators), it is necessarily exposed to much greater fatigue strains compared to other metals. While the strain-controlled fatigue performance of nitinol is superior to all other known metals, fatigue failures have been observed in the most demanding applications. There is a great deal of effort underway trying to better understand and define the durability limits of nitinol.

Nitinol is half nickel, and thus there has been a great deal of concern in the medical industry regarding the release of nickel, a known allergen and possible carcinogen. (Nickel is also present in substantial amounts in stainless steel and cobalt-chrome alloys.)  When properly treated (via electropolishing and/or passivation), nitinol forms a very stable protective TiO2 layer that acts as a very effective and self-healing barrier against ion exchange. It has been repeatedly shown that nitinol releases nickel at a slower pace than stainless steel, for example.  With that said, very early medical devices were made without electropolishing, and corrosion was observed.  Today's nitinol vascular self-expandable metallic stents, for example, show no evidence of corrosion or nickel release, and the outcomes in patients with and without nickel allergies are indistinguishable.

There are constant and long-running discussions regarding inclusions in nitinol, both TiC and Ti2NiOx.  As in all other metals and alloys, inclusions can be found in Nitinol. The size, distribution and type of inclusions can be controlled to some extent. Theoretically, smaller, rounder and few inclusions should lead to increased fatigue durability.  In literature, some early works report to have failed to show measurable differences, while novel studies demonstrate a dependence of fatigue resistance on the typical inclusion size in an alloy.

Nitinol is difficult to weld, both to itself and other materials. Laser welding nitinol to itself is a relatively routine process. More recently, strong joints between NiTi wires and stainless steel wires have been made using nickel filler. Laser and tungsten inert gas (TIG) welds have been made between NiTi tubes and stainless steel tubes . More research is ongoing into other processes and other metals to which nitinol can be welded.

Actuation frequency of nitinol is dependent on heat management, especially during the cooling phase. Numerous methods are used to increase the cooling performance, such as forced air, flowing liquids, thermoelectric modules (i.e. Peltier or semiconductor heat pumps), heat sinks, conductive materials and higher surface-to-volume ratio (improvements up to 3.3 Hz with very thin wires and up to 100 Hz with thinfilm nitinol). The fastest nitinol actuation recorded was carried by a high voltage capacitor discharge which heated an SMA wire in a manner of microseconds, and resulted in a complete phase transformation (and high velocities) in a few milliseconds.

Recent advances have shown that processing of nitinol can expand thermomechanical capabilities, allowing for multiple shape memories to be embedded within a monolithic structure. Research on multi-memory technology is on-going and promises to deliver enhanced shape memory devices in the near future
, and the application of new materials and material structures, such hybrid shape memory materials (SMMs) and shape memory composites (SMCs).

Applications

There are four commonly used types of applications for nitinol:
 Free recovery
 Nitinol is deformed at a low temperature, and heated to recover its original shape through the Shape Memory effect.
 Constrained recovery
  As for free recovery, except that recovery is rigidly prevented and thus a stress is generated.
 Work production
 Here the alloy is allowed to recover, but to do so it must act against a force (thus doing work).
 Superelasticity
 Nitinol acts as a super spring through the Superelastic effect. 
 Superelastic materials undergo stress-induced transformation and are commonly recognized for their "shape-memory" property. Due to its superelasticity, NiTi wires exhibit "elastocaloric" effect, which is stress-triggered heating/cooling. NiTi wires are currently under research as the most promising material for the technology. The process begins with tensile loading on the wire, which causes fluid (within the wire) to flow to  HHEX (Hot Heat Exchanger). Simultaneously, heat will be expelled, which can be used to heat the surrounding. In the reverse process, tensile unloading of the wire leads to fluid flowing to CHEX (Cold Heat Exchanger), causing the NiTi wire to absorpt heat from the surrounding. Therefore, the temperature of the surrounding can be decreased (cooled).

 Elastocaloric devices are often compared with magnetocaloric devices as new methods of efficient heating/cooling. Elastocaloric device made with NiTi wires has an advantage over magnetocaloric device made with Gadolinium due to its specific cooling power (at 2 Hz), which is 70X better (7 kWh/kg vs. 0.1 kWh/kg). However, elastocaloric device made with NiTi wires also have limitations, such as its short fatigue life and dependency on large tensile forces (energy consuming).

 In 1989 a survey was conducted in the United States and Canada that involved seven organizations. The survey focused on predicting the future technology, market, and applications of SMAs. The companies predicted the following uses of nitinol in a decreasing order of importance: (1) Couplings, (2) Biomedical and medical, (3) Toys, demonstration, novelty items, (4) Actuators, (5) Heat Engines, (6) Sensors, (7) Cryogenically activated die and bubble memory sockets, and finally (8) lifting devices.

Today, nitinol finds application in the listed industrial applications:

Thermal and electrical actuators
Nitinol can be used to replace conventional actuators (solenoids, servo motors, etc.), such as in the Stiquito, a simple hexapod robot.
Nitinol springs are used in thermal valves for fluidics, where the material both acts as a temperature sensor and an actuator.
It is used as autofocus actuator in action cameras and as an optical image stabilizer in mobile phones.
It is used in pneumatic valves for comfort seating and has become an industry standard.
The 2014 Chevrolet Corvette incorporates nitinol actuators, which replaced heavier motorized actuators to open and close the hatch vent that releases air from the trunk, making it easier to close.

Biocompatible and biomedical applications

 Nitinol is highly biocompatible and has properties suitable for use in orthopedic implants. Due to Nitinol's unique properties it has seen a large demand for use in less invasive medical devices. Nitinol tubing is commonly used in catheters, stents, and superelastic needles.
 In colorectal surgery, the material is used in devices for reconnecting the intestine after removing the pathogens.
 Nitinol is used for devices developed by Franz Freudenthal to treat patent ductus arteriosus, blocking a blood vessel that bypasses the lungs and has failed to close after birth in an infant.
 In dentistry, the material is used in orthodontics for brackets and wires connecting the teeth. Once the SMA wire is placed in the mouth its temperature rises to ambient body temperature. This causes the nitinol to contract back to its original shape, applying a constant force to move the teeth. These SMA wires do not need to be retightened as often as other wires because they can contract as the teeth move unlike conventional stainless steel wires. Additionally, nitinol can be used in endodontics, where nitinol files are used to clean and shape the root canals during the root canal procedure.  Because of the high fatigue tolerance and flexibility of nitinol, it greatly decreases the possibility of an endodontic file breaking inside the tooth during root canal treatment, thus improving safety for the patient.
 Another significant application of nitinol in medicine is in stents: a collapsed stent can be inserted into an artery or vein, where body temperature warms the stent and the stent returns to its original expanded shape following removal of a constraining sheath; the stent then helps support the artery or vein to improve blood flow. It is also used as a replacement for sutures—nitinol wire can be woven through two structures then allowed to transform into its preformed shape, which should hold the structures in place.
 Similarly, collapsible structures composed of braided, microscopically-thin nitinol filaments can be used in neurovascular interventions such as stroke thrombolysis, embolization, and intracranial angioplasty.
 A more recent application of nitinol wire is in female contraception, specifically in intrauterine devices.

Damping systems in structural engineering 
 Superelastic Nitinol finds a variety of applications in civil structures such as bridges and buildings. One such application is Intelligent Reinforced Concrete (IRC), which incorporates Ni-Ti wires embedded within the concrete. These wires can sense cracks and contract to heal macro-sized cracks.
 Another application is active tuning of structural natural frequency using Nitinol wires to damp vibrations.

Other applications and prototypes 
Demonstration model heat engines have been built which use nitinol wire to produce mechanical energy from hot and cold heat sources. A prototype commercial engine developed in the 1970s by engineer Ridgway Banks at Lawrence Berkeley National Laboratory, was named the Banks Engine.
Nitinol is also popular in extremely resilient glasses frames. It is also used in some mechanical watch springs.
Boeing engineers successfully flight-tested SMA-actuated morphing chevrons on the Boeing 777-300ER Quiet Technology Demonstrator 2.
The Ford Motor Company has registered a US patent for what it calls a ‘bicycle derailleur apparatus for controlling bicycle speed’. Filed on 22 April 2019, the patent depicts a front derailleur for a bicycle, devoid of cables, instead using two Nitinol wires to provide the movement needed to shift gears.
It can be used as a temperature control system; as it changes shape, it can activate a switch or a variable resistor to control the temperature.
It has been used in cell-phone technology as a retractable antenna, or microphone boom, due to its highly flexible and mechanical memory nature.
It is used to make certain surgical implants, such as the SmartToe.
It is used in some novelty products, such as self-bending spoons which can be used by amateur and stage magicians to demonstrate "psychic" powers or as a practical joke, as the spoon will bend itself when used to stir tea, coffee, or any other warm liquid.
It can also be used as wires which are used to locate and mark breast tumours so that the following surgery can be more exact.
Due to the high damping capacity of Superelastic nitinol, it is also used as a golf club insert.
Nickel titanium can be used to make the underwires for underwire bras.
It is used in some actuation-bending devices, such as those developed by Finnish technology company Modti Inc.
It is used in the neckbands of several headphones due to its superelasticity and durability.
It is being increasingly used for wire stemmed fishing floats due to its superelasticity.

References

Further reading
 H.R. Chen, ed., Shape Memory Alloys: Manufacture, Properties and Applications, Nova Science Publishers, Inc., 2010, .
 Y.Y. Chu & L.C. Zhao, eds., Shape Memory Materials and Its [sic] Applications, Trans Tech Publications Ltd., 2002, .
 D.C. Lagoudas, ed., Shape Memory Alloys, Springer Science+Business Media LLC, 2008, .
 K. Ōtsuka & C.M. Wayman, eds., Shape Memory Materials, Cambridge University Press, 1998, 
Sai V. Raj, Low Temperature Creep of Hot-extruded Near-stoichiometric NiTi Shape Memory Alloy, National Aeronautics and Space Administration, Glenn Research Center, 2013.
 Gerald Julien, Nitinol Technologies, Inc Edgewood, Wa. Us patent" 6422010 Manufacturing of Nitinol Parts & Forms
A process of making parts and forms of Type 60 Nitinol having a shape memory effect, comprising: selecting a Type 60 Nitinol. Inventor G, Julien, CEO of Nitinol Technologies, Inc. (Washington State)

External links

Society of Shape Memory and Superelastic Technologies
Nitinol Resource Library
Physical properties of nitinol
Nitinol Technical Resource Library
Literature on Nitinol Wire
Nitinol-Tubing
How NASA Reinvented The Wheel - Shape Memory Alloys

Dental materials
Biomaterials
United States Navy
Materials science
Solid-state chemistry
Smart materials
 
Intermetallics

tr:Şekil Hafızalı Alaşımlar